"Once to Every Man and Nation" is a hymn based upon the poem "The Present Crisis" by James Russell Lowell.

The original poem was written as a protest against the Mexican–American War.

The hymn was written to the tune of Ebenezer (hymn) by Thomas J. Williams in 1890.

References

Hymns
Songs based on poems
Protest songs